Cola & Pola is a Colombian brand of drink. It is a type of shandy, known in Colombia as refajo, that mixes Champagne cola and beer. The drink was introduced in 1993 by Bavaria Brewery. It has an ABV of 2%, making it a low alcohol beer.

The drink is named in honor of a Colombian heroine, Policarpa Salavarrieta, who is known as "La Pola".

See also
 Beer in Colombia
 Michelada
 Postobón

References

External links
 Official website

Beer in Colombia